Weatherford High School is a high school in Weatherford, Oklahoma, United States.

Notable alumni
NASA Astronaut Thomas P. Stafford, Commander of Apollo 10 which orbited the Moon in 1969.

References

External links
 

Public high schools in Oklahoma
Schools in Custer County, Oklahoma